The reference mark or reference symbol "※" is a typographic mark or word used in Chinese, Japanese and Korean (CJK) writing.

The symbol was used historically to call attention to an important sentence or idea, such as a prologue or footnote. As an indicator of a note, the mark serves the exact same purpose as the asterisk in English. However, in Japanese usage, the note text is placed directly into the main text immediately after the komejirushi symbol, rather than at the bottom of the page or end of chapter as is the case in English writing.

Names 

Informally, the symbol is often called , as it is often used to indicate the presence of pool halls, due to its visual similarity to two crossed cue sticks and four billiard balls.

It is not often used in Chinese writing.

Unicode 
In Unicode, the symbol has code point

See also 
, also called reference signal or midamble in wireless communications.

References

Symbols
Japanese writing system
Korean writing system